The swimming competitions at the 2012 Summer Olympics in London took place from 28 July to 4 August at the Aquatics Centre. The open-water competition took place from 9 to 10 August in Hyde Park.

Swimming featured 34 events (17 male, 17 female), including two 10 km open-water marathons in Hyde Park's Serpentine Lake. The remaining 32 were contested in a 50 m long course pool within the Olympic Park.

United States claimed a total of 31 medals (16 golds, 9 silver, and 6 bronze) in the leaderboard to maintain its supremacy as the most successful nation in swimming. Brought by an unprecedented sporting domination, Michael Phelps emerged as the most decorated Olympian of all time after winning six more medals at these Games to bring his total after the 2012 games to 22 (18 golds, 2 silver, and 2 bronze). Battling against the Americans for an overall medal count, China mounted to an unexpected second-place effort on the leaderboard with a tally of 10 medals (five golds, three silver, and bronze) after striking a superb double from Sun Yang in long-distance freestyle (both 400 and 1500 m) and Ye Shiwen in the individual medley (both 200 and 400 m). Meanwhile, France ended on a spectacular fashion in third spot with a total of seven medals (four golds, two silver, and one bronze), followed by the Netherlands with four, including two golds from Ranomi Kromowidjojo in sprint freestyle (both 50 and 100 m), and South Africa with three.

For the first time since 1992, Australia delivered an underwhelming performance with only a single triumph in the freestyle relay, but managed to bring home a total of ten medals. After not winning a gold in swimming since 2000, Japan produced the most medals in the post-war era to build a tally of eleven (three silver and eight bronze).

A total of nine world records and twenty five Olympic records were set during the competition.

Events 

Similar to the program's format in 2008, swimming featured a total of 34 events (17 each for men and women) including two 10 km open-water marathons. The following events were contested (all pool events were long course, and distances are in metres unless stated):
Freestyle: 50, 100, 200, 400, 800 (women), and 1,500 (men);
Backstroke: 100 and 200;
Breaststroke: 100 and 200;
Butterfly: 100 and 200;
Individual medley: 200 and 400;
Relays: 4×100 free, 4×200 free; 4×100 medley
Marathon: 10 kilometres

Schedule
Similar to the previous Olympics since 2000, with the exception of 2008, swimming program schedule occurred in two segments. For the pool events, prelims were held in the morning, with semifinals and final in the following evening session.

Qualification

FINA By-Law BL 9.3.6.4 (swimming) and BL 9.3.7.5.3 (open water) lays out the qualification procedures for the "Swimming" competition at the Olympics. Each country is allowed to enter up to two swimmers per individual event (provided they qualify), and one entry per relay; and a country may not have more than 26 males and 26 females (52 total) on its team.

Swimming – individual events
On 11 November 2010, FINA posted the qualifying times for individual events for the 2012 Olympics. The time standards consist of two time standards, an "Olympic Qualifying Time" and an "Olympic invitation time". Each country was able to enter up to two swimmers per event, provided both swimmers met the (faster) qualifying time. A country was able to enter one swimmer per event that met the invitation standard. Any swimmer who met the "qualifying" time was entered in the event for the Games; a swimmer meeting the "invitation" standard was eligible for entry, and their entry was allotted/filled in by ranking.

If a country has no swimmers meeting either qualifying standard, it may enter one male and one female. A country that does not receive an allocation spot but has at least one swimmer who meets a qualifying standard may enter the swimmer with the highest ranking.

Swimming – relay events
Each relay event featured 16 teams, composed of:
12: the top-12 finishers at the 2011 World Championships in each relay event.
4: the 4 fastest non-qualified teams, based on times in the 15-months preceding the Olympics.

Open-water swimming
The men's and women's 10 km races at the 2012 Olympics each featured 25 swimmers:
10: the top-10 finishers in the 10 km races at the 2011 World Championships
9: the top-9 finishers at the 2012 Olympic Marathon Swim Qualifier (8–9 June 2012 in Setúbal, Portugal).
5: one representative from each FINA continent (Africa, Americas, Asia, Europe and Oceania). (These were selected based on the finishes at the qualifying race in Setúbal.)
1: from the host nation (Great Britain) if not qualified by other means. If Great Britain already had a qualifier in the race, this spot was allocated back into the general pool from the 2012 qualifying race.

Participating nations
FINA announced in early July 2012 that 631 athletes from 166 nations would compete in swimming events at the 2012 Olympics (note: all nations qualified for the 10 km races also had at least 1 swimmer qualified for the pool portion). 59 nations qualified via the A cut (OQT), 12 via the B cut (OST) and 95 via Universality. Brunei, Central African Republic, Djibouti, Ethiopia, Lesotho, Liechtenstein, Togo, and Tonga made their official debut in swimming. Meanwhile, Grenada, Iraq, and Saint Vincent and the Grenadines returned to the sport after an eight-year absence. Nations with swimmers at the Games are (team size in parentheses):

Medal table

Note: There were ties for silver in the men's 200 m freestyle and men's 100 m butterfly events.

Results

Men's events

 Swimmers who participated in the heats only and received medals.

Women's events

 Swimmers who participated in the heats only and received medals.

Olympic and world records broken

Men

Women 

All world records (WR) are subsequently Olympic records (OR).

Derya Büyükuncu and Lars Frölander were the first swimmers to participate in six consecutive Olympic Games (1992-2012).

Controversies
In the women's 400-metre individual medley, Chinese Ye Shiwen won in a world-record time of 4:28.43.  After the race, Ye had allegations against her suggesting the use of drugs that drew comment from the International Olympic Committee and FINA who defended Ye.  Ye has never tested positive of any performance-enhancing drugs.  Some claim the accusations were a result of xenophobia towards the Chinese.

In the final of the 100-metre breaststroke, South African Cameron van der Burgh won in a world-record time of 58.46, bettering the previous record of 58.58 held by Brenton Rickard of Australia.  After the race however, underwater camera footage showed winner van der Burgh did three illegal butterfly kicks on the underwater pullout (rules allow for one kick). Van der Burgh later admitted to the illegal move and justified the act by saying if he was not doing it, "you are falling behind or giving yourself a disadvantage."

Gallery of the medalists
Some of the Olympic medalists in London:

References

External links

 
 
 BBC – 2012 Olympics: Swimming. bbc.co.uk.
 
 

 
2012 Summer Olympics events
2012 in swimming
Hyde Park, London
Swimming competitions in the United Kingdom
2012
International aquatics competitions hosted by the United Kingdom